Neopleurotomoides callembryon is a species of sea snail, a marine gastropod mollusk in the family Raphitomidae.

Description
The length of the shell attains 3.1 mm, its diameter 1.5 mm.

The shell is quite solid. The spire barely exceeds half of the  total height. The shell contains 6 whorls, separated by an impressed suture. The protoconch is composed of 4 whorls: the first two are smooth, the next two show vertical, straight and filiform riblets, cut by an acute peripheral keel. The subsequent whorls are impressed at the top by the infra-sutural zone which is furnished with arcuated lines of growth. Then they become convex and show strong longitudinal ribs 
(13 on the body whorl) and narrower cords narrower, but also very conspicuous (4 on the penultimate whorl and 12 on the body whorl) 
which pass over the peristome and determine, at the points of intersection, small acute tubercles. The ribs are closer together and less prominent at the end of the body whorl. The aperture is wide open, terminated at the base by an open siphonal canal. The columella is slightly twisted and acuminate at the base. The outer lip is arcuate, tightly, but deeply indented at the top. The shell is white, the protoconch is barely tinged with light yellow.

Distribution
This marine species occurs  at bathyal depths off the Azores.

References

 Gofas, S.; Le Renard, J.; Bouchet, P. (2001). Mollusca. in: Costello, M.J. et al. (eds), European Register of Marine Species: a check-list of the marine species in Europe and a bibliography of guides to their identification. Patrimoines Naturels. 50: 180-213.

External links
  Serge GOFAS, Ángel A. LUQUE, Joan Daniel OLIVER,José TEMPLADO & Alberto SERRA (2021) - The Mollusca of Galicia Bank (NE Atlantic Ocean); European Journal of Taxonomy 785: 1–114
 

callembryon
Gastropods described in 1896